Subacute combined degeneration of spinal cord, also known as myelosis funiculus, or funicular myelosis, also Lichtheim's disease, and Putnam-Dana syndrome, refers to degeneration of the posterior and lateral columns of the spinal cord as a result of vitamin B12 deficiency (most common), vitamin E deficiency, and copper deficiency. It is usually associated with pernicious anemia.

Signs and symptoms
The onset is gradual and uniform.  The pathological findings of subacute combined degeneration consist of patchy losses of myelin in the dorsal and lateral columns. Patients present with weakness of the legs, arms, and trunk, and tingling and numbness that progressively worsens.  Vision changes and change of mental state may also be present. Bilateral spastic paresis may develop and pressure, vibration and touch sense are diminished. A positive Babinski sign may be seen. Prolonged deficiency of vitamin B12 leads to irreversible nervous system damage.  HIV-associated vacuolar myelopathy can present with a similar pattern of dorsal column and corticospinal tract demyelination.

It has been thought that if someone is deficient in vitamin B12 and folic acid, the vitamin B12 deficiency must be treated first. However, the basis for this has been challenged, although due to ethical considerations it is no longer able to be tested if "neuropathy is made more
severe as a result of giving folic acid to vitamin B12-
deficient individuals". And that if this were the case, then the mechanism remains unclear.

Administration of nitrous oxide anesthesia can precipitate subacute combined degeneration in people with subclinical vitamin B12 deficiency, while chronic nitrous oxide exposure can cause it even in persons with normal B12 levels.
Posterior column dysfunction decreases vibratory sensation and proprioception (joint sense). Lateral corticospinal tract dysfunction produces spasticity and dorsal spinocerebellar tract dysfunction causes ataxia.

Cause
In general, the most common cause of this condition is a deficiency of vitamin B12.
This may be due to a dietary deficiency, malabsorption in the terminal ileum, lack of intrinsic factor secreted from gastric parietal cells, or low gastric pH inhibiting attachment of intrinsic factor to ileal receptors. The disease can also be caused by inhalation of nitrous oxide, which inactivates vitamin B12.

Vitamin E deficiency, which is associated with malabsorption disorders such as cystic fibrosis and Bassen-Kornzweig syndrome, can cause a similar presentation due to the degeneration of the dorsal columns.

Diagnosis

Serum vitamin B12, methylmalonic acid, Schilling test, and a complete blood count, looking for megaloblastic anemia if there is also folic acid deficiency or macrocytic anemia. The Schilling test is no longer available in most areas.

MRI-T2 images may reveal increased signal within the white matter of the spinal cord, predominantly in the posterior columns and possibly in the spinothalamic tracts.

Treatment
Therapy with vitamin B12 results in partial to full recovery where SACD has been caused by vitamin B12 deficiency, depending on the duration and extent of neurodegeneration.

References

External links 

Histopathology
Neurodegenerative disorders